Doom with a View may refer to:

 "Doom with a View", an episode of Ruby Gloom TV series
 "Doom with a View", an episode of Murder, She Wrote TV series
 "Doom with a View", an episode of My Life as a Teenage Robot television series